The National Association of British Manufacturers (NABM), formerly the National Union of Manufacturers (NUM), was an employers' association in the United Kingdom.

Founded in 1915 as the British Manufacturers' Association (BMA), it was renamed the National Union of Manufacturers in 1917 and the National Association of British Manufacturers in 1961. It was particularly strong among small and middle-sized firms. It merged with the Federation of British Industries and the British Employers' Confederation in 1965 to form the Confederation of British Industry.

External links
 Catalogue of the NUM/NABM archives, held at the Modern Records Centre, University of Warwick

Business organisations based in the United Kingdom
1915 establishments in the United Kingdom